Quash is an English surname which may refer to

 Quamany Quash, an 18th century American former slave of Parting Ways (Plymouth, Massachusetts)
William Quash (1868–1938), an English soccer player
Ben Quash (born 1968), an English theologian 
Susanna Avery-Quash (born 1970), an English art historian 

English families